ABC Radio and Regional Content, later ABC Radio, was the division of the Australian Broadcasting Corporation responsible for radio output and regional content.

Origins
The first public radio station in Australia opened in Sydney at 8:00pm on 23 November 1923 under the call sign 2SB. Other stations in Melbourne, Brisbane, Adelaide, Perth and Hobart followed. A licensing scheme administered by the Postmaster-General's Department, was soon established allowing certain stations government funding, albeit with restrictions placed on their advertising content.

In 1924 the licensing system was changed. The Postmaster-General's Department collected all licence fees and broadcasters were funded as either A-Class or B-Class stations. A-Class stations received government funding and were able to take limited advertising, while B-Class stations received no government funding but could carry more advertising. By 1925 many of the A-Class stations were in financial difficulty.

A 1927 Royal Commission into wireless broadcasting recommended that radio licence fees be pooled to fund larger A-Class stations. The government established the National Broadcasting Service to take over the 12 A-Class licences as they came up for renewal from 1928. The original legislation permitted advertising, but this was removed from the Act before it came into effect. At the same time, the government created the Australian Broadcasting Company to supply programs to the new national broadcaster.

Initially the Postmaster-General's Department, which operated postal and telephone services, was responsible for operating the National Broadcasting Service, although this arrangement did not have universal political support. As a result, the Australian Broadcasting Commission was established on 1 July 1932 to take over the Australian Broadcasting Company and run the National Broadcasting Service. The ABC was to be based on the BBC model, funded primarily through listener license fees, with some direct government grants.

The Australian Broadcasting Commission's original twelve radio stations were:

 2FC Sydney
 2BL Sydney
 3AR Melbourne
 3LO Melbourne
 4QG Brisbane
 5CL Adelaide
 6WF Perth
 7ZL Hobart
 2NC Newcastle
 2CO Corowa
 4RK Rockhampton
 5CK Crystal Brook

These formed the basis for the present-day ABC Local Radio and Radio National networks.

The opening-day program included the first ‘Children's Session’ with ‘Bobby Bluegum’; the first sports program, ‘Racing Notes’, with WA Ferry calling the Randwick races; ‘British Wireless News’, received by cable from London; weather; stock exchange and shipping news; the ABC Women's Association session (on ‘commonsense housekeeping’ and needlecraft); a talk on goldfish and their care; as well as ‘Morning Devotions’ and music. Conductor Sir Bernard Heinze was appointed to the position of part-time musical adviser to the ABC in 1934. In 1937, the network was further expanded with the purchase of Brisbane's 4BC. Two years later, the commission began publishing the ABC Weekly - a radio magazine promoting the ABC's local radio, and later television, programs.

Over the next four years the stations were reformed into a cohesive broadcasting organisation through regular program relays, coordinated by a centralised bureaucracy. The Australian broadcast radio spectrum at the time was made up of the ABC and the commercial sector.

During the broadcaster's first decades, programs generally consisted of music, news and current affairs, sport, drama, children's educational supplements and school broadcasts. Because recording technology was still relatively primitive, all ABC programs (including music) were broadcast live until 1935, when the first disc-based recorder was installed at the commission's Sydney studios. For this purpose, the ABC established broadcasting orchestras in each state, and in some centres employed choruses and dance bands.

Amongst the other early programs were the stations' famous 'synthetic' cricket broadcasts - when tests were played in England, commentators in the ABC's Sydney studios used cables from London and sound effects to recreate the match in play. In addition, all 38 of William Shakespeare's plays were performed live between 1936 and 1938. Local drama was produced, with a competition for plays and sketches from Australian authors held in 1934. Talks from prominent figures of the time such as King George V, Pope Pius XI, British Prime Minister Ramsay MacDonald, Adolf Hitler and H. G. Wells were broadcast.

By 1933 regular program relays were in place between the ABC's stations in Sydney, Melbourne, Brisbane, Adelaide and Perth - it was not until 1936 that Hobart was connected with the mainland, through a cable under the Bass Strait. News bulletins, however, continued to be read in each state from local newspapers (by agreement with the Newspaper Proprietors Association). It was not until 1934 that the ABC hired its first journalist - the service continued to be expanded, with the appointment of a Federal News Editor in 1936, and in 1939 a Canberra correspondent to cover national politics.

World War II
During World War II, the ABC continued to recruit staff, including a greater proportion of women to replace men who had joined the armed forces. The organisation established reporting and recording facilities in a number of overseas locations, including the Middle East, Greece and around the Asia-Pacific region. An early challenge to its independence came in June, 1940 when wartime censorship was imposed, meaning that the Department of Information (headed by Keith Murdoch) took control of the ABC's 7 p.m. nightly national news bulletin. This lasted until September, when control of the news was returned to the ABC after listeners expressed a preference for independent news presented by the commission.

On 7 January 1941 the ABC revived the Children's Session as a national program, including the Argonauts Club, which was first broadcast in 1933–34 in Melbourne. The Argonauts Club proved hugely popular with young Australians - by 1950 there were over 50,000 members, with 10,000 new members joining each year through the 1950s. The Club encouraged children's contributions of writing, music, poetry and art, and became one of the ABC's most popular programs, running six days a week for 28 years.

Post-war period
In December, 1945 rural and regional affairs program The Country Hour premiered. The ABC's coverage of rural affairs was significantly enhanced by the deployment of journalists and 'extension officers' to major country areas.

9PA in Port Moresby was added to the ABC radio network on 1 July 1946. Additional stations were added to the network in Papua and New Guinea after this time.

Legislation passed in 1946 requiring the ABC to broadcast Parliament when in session. The first broadcast from Parliament was of Question Time on 10 July 1946. The broadcasts were put onto the interstate network; however the Commission frequently commented on the disruption this caused to its programming in its annual reports.

The ABC was also required to "secure its news for broadcasting purposes within the Commonwealth by its own staff, and abroad through such overseas news agencies and other overseas sources as it desired" (along with its own foreign correspondents). The news department continued to expand, and was inaugurated on 1 June 1947.

Changes made in the post-war moved "serious" programming such as news, current affairs, and features — early forms of what became known as documentaries to the commission's national network, with lighter entertainment programming left for the metropolitan stations. A Light Entertainment department was formed, to produce programs such as ABC Hit Parade, The Wilfrid Thomas Show, Bob Dyer's Dude Ranch and The Village Glee.

The increasing availability of landlines and teleprinters allowed the organisation to gather and broadcast news and other program material with much greater efficiency than in the previous two decades. By this time, as many as 13 national news bulletins were broadcast daily.

In 1948, the ABC began operating experimental FM stations on 92.1 MHz in many capital cities. These had ceased by 1958.

1960s–1980s
The Papua New Guinea part of the ABC radio network became the National Broadcasting Commission of PNG in 1973, as part of preparations for PNG independence.

In 1975, the ABC introduced a 24-hour-a-day AM rock station in Sydney, 2JJ (Double Jay), which was eventually expanded into the national Triple J FM network.

Also in 1975, 3ZZ Access Radio began in Melbourne. It gave access to airtime to people from many language groups that had previously rarely been heard on air. It was closed in 1977, with its assets absorbed by 3EA (later to be part of SBS).

A classical music network was established in 1976 on the FM band, broadcasting from Adelaide. It was initially known as ABC-FM - referring both to its 'fine music' programming and type of radio modulation.

The Australian Broadcasting Corporation Act 1983 changed the name of the organisation from the Australian Broadcasting Commission to the Australian Broadcasting Corporation effective 1 July 1983. At the same time, television and radio operations were split into two separate divisions, with an overhaul of management, finance, property and engineering undertaken.

In 1981 ABC Radio began carrying Aboriginal and Torres Strait Islander broadcasts in Alice Springs and later North Queensland, while at the same time comedy and social history units were set up, and news and current affairs output expanded.

A new Concert Music department was formed in 1985 to coordinate the corporation's six symphony orchestras, which in turn received a greater level of autonomy in order to better respond to local needs. Open-air free concerts and tours, educational activities, and joint ventures with other music groups were undertaken at the time to expand the Orchestras' audience reach.

ABC Radio was restructured significantly in 1985 - ABC Radio 1 became the ABC Metropolitan Radio network, while Radio 2 became known as Radio National (callsigns, however, were not standardised until 1990). New programs such as The World Today, Australia All Over and the Coodabeen Champions were introduced, while ABC-FM established an Australian Music Unit in 1989. Radio Australia began to focus on the Asia-Pacific region, with coverage targeted at the south west and central Pacific, south-east Asia, and north Asia. Radio Australia also carried more news coverage, with special broadcasts during the 1987 Fijian coups d'état, Tiananmen Square massacre and the Gulf War.

A government initiative undertaken in 1987 known as the Second Regional Radio Network established nineteen new studios in regional areas (with an additional sixteen upgraded), as well as approximately 300 additional transmitters. At the same time, Radio National and ABC-FM were expanded into these areas.

In August 1988, the Parliamentary Broadcast Network (PBN) was established under the National Metropolitan Radio Plan, as a dedicated station to carry the ABC's mandatory Parliamentary broadcasts on AM transmitters in each state capital as well as Newcastle and Canberra.

1990s

Increasing pressure throughout the 1980s led the ABC to divest its orchestras in 1990. They formed Symphony Australia, an umbrella organisation that coordinates the now independent state-based orchestras (still owned by the ABC). The Sydney Symphony Orchestra was the first to be corporatised in 1996 when Sydney Symphony Orchestra Holdings Pty Ltd was formed.

During this period, the ABC set in motion plans to consolidate its properties and buildings in Sydney and Melbourne into single sites in each city. It was not until 1991, however that the corporation's Sydney radio and orchestral operations moved to a new building built by Leighton Contractors on a single site in the inner-city suburb of Ultimo. In Melbourne, the ABC Southbank Centre was completed in 1994, and now houses the radio division in Victoria as well as the Melbourne Symphony Orchestra.

On 15 August 1994 the Parliamentary and News Network (PNN) was launched, to provide a continuous news network broadcast on the same frequencies used by the PBN, when Parliament was not sitting, and in 1996, it was named "ABC NewsRadio on the Parliamentary and News Network".

ABC-FM relaunched in 1994 as ABC Classic FM, accompanied by major changes to the station's music and programming.

By the early 1990s, all major ABC broadcasting outlets moved to 24 hour-a-day operation, while regional radio coverage in Australia was extended with 80 new transmitters. Live television broadcasts of selected parliamentary sessions started in 1990.

In 1995, D-Cart digital technology developed by ABC Radio attracted worldwide interest and was sold to European, North American and Asian markets. The ABC used D-Radio, the first fully digital audio system, for Triple J.

Trials for digital radio began in the 1990s, using the popular Eureka 147 standard. At the same time, the majority of operations were upgraded to fully digitised systems for program playout and storage, as well as a word processing system adapted specifically for the needs of the division's news services.

2000s
Throughout the 2000s, ABC Radio continued to upgrade its studio and transmitter facilities. The ABC attracted large audiences for its non-commercial radio coverage of the 2000 Summer Olympics, with a range of programming across its various networks. All networks celebrated 100 years of radio in 2001 with special broadcasts marking the event and a limited edition CD released, with highlights of the ABC's output since 1932.

ABC NewsRadio began streaming its news programming online while its radio network broadcast parliament in 2002 - amongst the first of the corporation's radio networks to offer live, exclusive, streaming online. The service also expanded into the Gold Coast - the first new coverage area for the network in five years. In 2009 ABC Radio switched on DAB+ services, relaying its main channels and progressively launched new digital channels over subsequent years.

2010s

Around 2010, ABC NewsRadio became the full name of what had been "ABC NewsRadio on the Parliamentary and News Network".)

The ABC Radio app was launched in 2012, to be replaced by the ABC Listen app in September 2017, which included 45 ABC radio stations and audio networks.

There was an organisational restructure of the ABC in 2017–18.

See also
List of ABC radio stations

References

External links

 
Australian Broadcasting Corporation divisions
Public radio in Australia
Podcasting companies